Football 7-a-side at the 1982 International Cerebral Palsy Games was held in Greve. Football 7-a-side is played by athletes with cerebral palsy, a condition characterized by impairment of muscular coordination, stroke, or traumatic brain injury (TBI).

Football 7-a-side was played with modified FIFA rules. Among the modifications were that there were seven players, no offside, a smaller playing field, and permission for one-handed throw-ins. Matches consisted of two thirty-minute halves, with a fifteen-minute half-time break.

Participating teams and officials

Teams

Venues 
The venues to be used for the World Championships were located in Greve.

Finals 
Position 3-4

Final

Statistics

Ranking

See also

References

External links 
 Cerebral Palsy International Sports & Recreation Association (CPISRA)
 International Federation of Cerebral Palsy Football (IFCPF)

1982 in association football
1982
1982 in Danish football
Paralympic association football
CP football